Abdullah Mohamed Al-Anbari (born 2 June 1970) is an Omani middle-distance runner. He competed in the men's 800 metres at the 1992 Summer Olympics.

References

External links
 

1970 births
Living people
Athletes (track and field) at the 1992 Summer Olympics
Omani male middle-distance runners
Olympic athletes of Oman
Place of birth missing (living people)
Athletes (track and field) at the 1998 Asian Games
Asian Games competitors for Oman